Stigmella pretiosa is a moth of the family Nepticulidae. It is found from Fennoscandia to the Alps, and from Scotland to the Baltic region and Slovakia.

The wingspan is 5.5-6.5 mm. There is one generation per year.

The larvae feed on Geum montanum, Geum rivale, Geum urbanum, Rubus caesius, Rubus fruticosus, Rubus idaeus and Rubus macrophyllus. They mine the leaves of their host plant. The mine consists of a long corridor. It runs along the vein. In the first part the frass is concentrated in a rather narrow, often interrupted central line.

External links
Fauna Europaea
bladmineerders.nl

Nepticulidae
Moths of Europe
Moths described in 1862